Graves is a surname of English origin. Its distribution within England is centered on Lincolnshire, followed in concentration by Lancashire, Yorkshire, Cumbria, and East Anglia. The surname is likely a variant of Grave with genitival or post-medieval excrescent -s. The surname Grave seems to have its possible origins in: 1. "Occupational name from Middle English greyve, grayve, greve 'steward bailif, manorial officer who managed the lord's demense farm, headman of a town or village', a borrowing from Old Scandinavian greifi 'earl, count". 2. "Locative name from Middle English grave "pit" (Old English graef)". 3. "Relationship name (in Norfolk), possibly from the rare Middle English personal name Gre(y)vy, Gre(i)ve, Old Scandinavian Greifi, *Grefe, originally a nickname meaning 'earl, count".

The name likely seems to be of Scandinavian origin within England, as suggested by its distribution which corresponds largely to counties of the former Danelaw. This suggests its most common origin being that of an occupational surname, as the Grave is the Norse derived Danelaw counterpart to the Old English Reeve.

Bearers of the surname Graves most commonly belong to haplogroups R1b-U106, R1b-P312, I1, and I2. Lines have also been identified as belonging to E, J, R1a, and Q. This confirms the multiple origins of various Graves lines.

Notable Bearers
 Adam Graves, Canadian ice hockey player
 Adelia Cleopatra Graves (1821–1895), American educator and author
 Alfred Perceval Graves, Irish writer
 Bibb Graves, American politician
 Bill Graves, American politician
 Cecil Graves, BBC Director-General
 Charles Graves (disambiguation), several people
 Clare W. Graves, American psychologist
 Danny Graves, American baseball player
 Denyce Graves, American mezzo-soprano
 Dick Graves, American businessman
 Dixie Bibb Graves, American politician, wife of Bibb Graves
 D. V. Graves (Dorsett Vandeventer Graves, 1886–1960), American college sports coach
 Earl G. Graves Sr. (1935–2020), African-American entrepreneur and founder of Black Enterprise
 Ed Graves (1917–1980), American art director
 Edward O. Graves (1843–1909), American banker
 Ernest Graves (actor), American actor
 Ernest Graves, Sr., American athlete, coach, and military officer
 Evelyn Paget Graves, 9th Baron Graves (1926–2002)
 Ezra Graves (1809–1883), New York judge and politician
 George Graves (actor) (1876–1949), English comic actor
 George Graves (biologist) (1784–1839), English naturalist
 George S. Graves, American politician
 Henry Graves (disambiguation), several people
 James Graves (disambiguation), several people
 Jerry Graves, American basketball player
 John Graves (disambiguation), several people
 Josh Graves, American bluegrass musician
 Keara Graves, Canadian actress
 Kelly Graves (born 1963), American basketball coach
 Kersey Graves, American theological reformist and writer
 Kyle Graves, Canadian football player
 Leslie Graves, American actress
 Lucia Graves, British novelist and translator
 Lulu Grace Graves (1874–1949), American dietitian
 L. C. Graves (1918–1995), American police detective
 Marion Coats Graves (1885–1962), American educator
 Mary H. Graves, American minister, editor, writer
 Michael Graves, American architect
 Michael Graves (audio engineer), American audio engineer, born 1968
 Michael Graves (poker player) (born 1984), American poker player
 Michale Graves, American singer/songwriter
 Milford Graves, American-born jazz drummer
 Morris Graves, American artist
 Nancy Graves, American sculptor
 Nell Cole Graves, American potter 
 Nelson Z. Graves Sr., American businessman
 Nelson Z. Graves Jr., Philadelphian cricketer
 Paul D. Graves (1907–1972), New York politician and judge
 Peter Graves (disambiguation), several people
 Philip Graves, British journalist
 Ralph Graves (1900–1977), American screenwriter, film director and actor
 Ralph Graves (writer) (1924–2013), American writer
 Randall Graves, New York politician, assemblyman 1829
 Ray Graves, American footballer
 Richard Graves (disambiguation), several people
 Robert Graves (disambiguation), several people
 Roosevelt Graves,  American blues guitarist and singer
 Ross Graves (1874–1940), New York politician
 Rupert Graves, English actor
 Ryan Graves (disambiguation), several people
 Sam Graves, American politician
 Samuel Graves, British Admiral
 Samuel Robert Graves, Irish-born businessman and Conservative politician (1818–1873)
 Steve Graves, Canadian former NHL player
 Teresa Graves, African-American actress
 Terrence C. Graves, American marine
 Thomas Graves (disambiguation), several people
 Tomás Graves, writer and musician
 White Graves (born 1942), American football player
 William Graves (disambiguation), several people

Fictional characters
 Agent Graves, fictional character from 100 Bullets
 Gustav Graves, villain in the James Bond film Die Another Day
 Mercy Graves, DC Comics character
 Nathan Graves, fictional character, Castlevania: Circle of the Moon
 Randal Graves, fictional character in Clerks
 Malcolm Graves, a playable character in the online arena game League of Legends
 Lincoln Graves, a playable character in the video game Conflict: Denied Ops
 Percival Graves, fictional character in Fantastic Beasts and Where to Find Them

See also
 Baron Graves
 Graves Brothers, American gospel musicians
 Graves disease, named after Robert James Graves

References

English-language surnames